Tomé Domínguez de Mendoza   (1623 - After 1692) was a Spanish soldier (native of modern Mexico) who served as acting Governor of New Mexico in 1664.

Biography
Tomé Domínguez de Mendoza was baptized on February 19, 1623, in Mexico City. His father, who had the same name, was a Spanish officer and former wine merchant who lived in Mexico City for a while and emigrated to New Mexico with his wife and at least 7 children in the mid-1630s. Tomé (II) was brother of the soldier Juan Dominguez de Mendoza.

Mendoza joined the Spanish Army in his youth. In the first half of 1660, he lived below Isleta Pueblo, New Mexico. Since about 1656 Mendoza held the charges of alcalde mayor of the region and Lieutenant General of the Rio Abajo zone. He was replaced in both charges by Juan Dominguez, his brother, in 1659.  Later, Tomé got the rank of sergeant of the Spanish army. 

In 1662 Tomé was appointed for several key positions at the New Mexico government. So he held the charges of Lieutenant General, perpetual regidor and treasurer of the Santa Cruzada. 

Later, a faction led by him accused and "filed grave charges" against the governor of the province (at this time New Mexico was a province) Juan Durán de Miranda, which caused a brief imprisonment and the seizure of all his goods.

Tomé Domínguez de Mendoza was appointed Acting Governor of Santa Fe de Nuevo México in 1664. However, his government only lasted until Durán de Miranda (who was released from prison when he presented his arguments about the charges issued against him in Mexico City) recovered his government in the province a year later.

In 1676, Tomé was appointed Lieutenant Governor of the province by Juan Francisco Treviño. In June of that year, Tome was ordered to form an troop against the Apaches who were attacking  Socorro and Senecú. In 1677 and 1680, he joined the cabildo of Santa Fe, the capital of New Mexico. For the last decade, Tomé continued to participate in political and military functions in the province.

In August 1680, Tomé and his family moved to El Paso del Norte (Ciudad Juarez, in modern Mexico), along with other residents of Rio Abajo, New Mexico. There, he held several positions. One of the positions he occupied was Maeses de Campo "with full complement of arms."

In 1681, Mendoza, at sixty-one years old, died from gout and a stomach disease.

Personal life 
Mendoza married twice: his first marriage was to Catalina López Mederos, with whom he had 6 children: Tome III, Antonio, Juana, Francisco  (who died in the war against the Puebloans), Juan and Diego (both were injured in the same war) Domínguez de Mendoza. The second was with Ana Velásquez, with whom he had two additional children: José and Juana Domínguez.

About 1659, Governor Bernardo López de Mendizábal gave Mendoza an encomienda to the south of Isleta. When the encomienda passed into his hands, so too did the Native American population who resided there. Mendoza took advantage of this to Christianize them and make them work for him as a way of "partial compensation" for the debts he owed to the Spanish Crown for several services that the crown provided to him (i.e. protection).

In Isleta, the Dominguez family settled to the west of El Cerro de Tomé, near Tome Hill (next to Rio Grande). However, when the Pueblo Revolt broke out in 1680, thirty-eight members of the Dominguez family were attacked and killed by the Pueblo Native Americans. In addition to his four sons who fought in the Pueblo Revolt of 1680 (among them Tome III), his other two sons, Juan and Diego, were attacked by poisoned arrows. Other family members, such as grandchildren, sons-in-law, brothers and nephews may have also been killed in the war.

For the most part, those who survived were forced to leave the place, emigrating south to El Paso del Norte (modern Ciudad Juarez, North of modern Mexico). So, in 1682, Don Pedro de Tomé y Chaves (brother of the first wife of Mendoza, Catalina López Mederos) got permission to migrate to modern-day Mexico with his family and the family of Mendoza.  In 1683, Tomé lived in Los Sauces, north of Chihuahua, Mexico. Thanks to the Peace Treaty between the Puebloans and the Spanish, Mendoza emigrated to Spain and never returned to New Mexico.

Legacy 
The village of Tomé was built in the place where he resided, after being named as Tomé Domínguez de Mendoza.

References 

Colonial governors of Santa Fe de Nuevo México
1626 births
People from Mexico City
Year of death unknown